Sønderborg Barbarians RK is a Danish rugby club in Sønderborg.

External links
Sønderborg Barbarians RK on Facebook

Danish rugby union teams
Sønderborg Municipality